Kristen A. Stilt is an Islamic studies scholar who focuses on law and society in both historical and contemporary contexts. She wrote Islamic Law in Action: Authority, Discretion, and Everyday Experiences in Mamluk Egypt.

Education
Stilt earned a JD from the University of Texas School of Law. Stilt earned a PhD in History and Middle Eastern Studies from Harvard University.

Career
In 2013, Stilt was awarded a Guggenheim Fellowship for her work in constitutional law. Currently, Stilt is a Director of the Islamic Legal Studies Programs at Harvard Law School. In the past, Stilt has won Fulbright and Fulbright-Hays awards.

Works
Stilt, Kristen A. "Contextualizing Constitutional Islam: The Malaysian Experience," 13 Int'l J. Const. L. 407 (2015).
Stilt, Kristen A. "Constitutions in Authoritarian Regimes: the Case of Egypt" in Constitutions in Authoritarian Regimes 111 (Tom Ginsburg & Alberto Simper eds., University of Chicago Press, 2013).
Stilt, Kristen A. Islamic Law in Action: Authority, Discretion, and Everyday Experiences in Mamluk Egypt (Oxford University Press 2011) .

References

Harvard Law School faculty
University of Texas School of Law alumni
Harvard University alumni